Adenandra is a genus of evergreen shrubs of the family Rutaceae, commonly known as buchu (plural buchus). The genus is native to South Africa. The plants are related to the citrus family, and have oil glands in the leaves which give off a distinctive aroma. The name Adenandra derives from Greek aden, a gland; ander, a man. The leaves are small and almost scale-like, being sessile or subsessile (stalkless of almost stalkless). The conspicuous flowers have five petals, and are pink or white. Adenandra are cultivated by gardeners for their ornamental and aromatic value.

Species

There are around 18 Adenandra species, including:
Adenandra acuta: pointy Chinaflower
Adenandra brachyphylla: shortleaf Chinaflower
Adenandra coriacea
Adenandra dahlgrenii: Aynsberg Chinaflower
Adenandra fragrans: smelly Chinaflower 
Adenandra gracilis
Adenandra gummifera: gummy Chinaflower
Adenandra lasiantha
Adenandra marginata: loose Chinaflower
Adenandra multiflora: Kogelberg Chinaflower
Adenandra mundiifolia: resin Chinaflower
Adenandra obtusata: glutinous Chinaflower
Adenandra odoratissima
Adenandra rotundifolia: roundleaf Chinaflower
Adenandra schlechteri
Adenandra uniflora: Chinaflower
Adenandra villosa: hairy Chinaflower
Adenandra viscida: sticky Chinaflower

References

Zanthoxyloideae genera
Zanthoxyloideae